Ingeborg Nilsson (23 November 1924 – 3 February 1995) was a Norwegian figure skater.  She competed at the 1952 Winter Olympics in Oslo. She was Norwegian individual champion in 1953 and 1954, and in pairs in 1956, 1957, 1958 and 1959 together with partner Reidar Børjeson.

Results

Ladies singles

Pairs
(with Børjeson)

References

External links

1924 births
1995 deaths
Norwegian female single skaters
Norwegian female pair skaters
Olympic figure skaters of Norway
Figure skaters at the 1952 Winter Olympics
Norwegian people of Swedish descent
20th-century Norwegian women